State v. Ebrahim is a South African legal case.

State v. Ebrahim, 1991 (2) SALR 553 

In Ebrahim, two men identifying themselves as South African police officers seized a South African member of the military wing of the anti-apartheid African National Congress in Swaziland in December 1986. Ebrahim was bound, gagged, blindfolded, and brought to Pretoria and charged with treason. Swaziland did not protest this abduction. Ebrahim argued that his abduction and rendition violated international law, and that the trial court was thus incompetent to try him because international law was a part of South African law.

Invoking Roman-Dutch common law, the Court concluded that it lacked jurisdiction to try a person brought before it from another state by means of state-sponsored abduction. These common law rules embody fundamental legal principles, including "the preservation and promotion of human rights, friendly international relations, and the sound administration of justice." The Court continued:

The individual must be protected from unlawful arrest and abduction, jurisdictional boundaries must not be exceeded, international legal sovereignty must be respected, the legal process must be fair towards those affected by it, and the misuse thereof must be avoided in order to protect and promote the dignity and integrity of the judicial system. This applies equally to the State. When the State is itself party to a dispute, as for example in criminal cases, it must come to court "with clean hands" as it were. When the State is itself involved in an abduction across international borders as in the instant case, its hands cannot be said to be clean.

The Court also noted that "the abduction was a violation of the applicable rules of international law, that these rules are part of [South African] law, and that this violation of these rules deprived the trial court competence to hear the matter." In a subsequent civil proceeding, Ebrahim was awarded compensation for the kidnapping.

References 
 
Jeffrey L. Dunoff, Steven R. Ratner, and David Wippman, International Law, Norms, Actors, Process: A Problem-oriented Approach. Aspen Publishers, 2006, 3rd Edition.

History of the African National Congress